The 2015 ATX Pro Challenge was the first edition of the preseason soccer tournament. The tournament was hosted by USL Pro side Austin Aztex with matches being played at Mike A. Myers Stadium on the campus of the University of Texas at Austin.

The first installation of the tournament was won by D.C. United, who beat FC Dallas 1–0 in the final.

Participants

Bracket

Matches

Semifinals

Consolation match

Final

Scorers 
2 goals
  Ryan Hollingshead — FC Dallas

1 goal
  Miguel Aguilar — D.C. United
  Chad Barson — Columbus Crew
  Conor Doyle — D.C. United
  Blas Pérez — FC Dallas
  Chris Rolfe — D.C. United
  Kristinn Steindórsson — Columbus Crew

See also 
 ATX Pro Challenge

References 

2015 in American soccer
Atx Pro Challenge
American soccer friendly trophies